Valentino d'Apreja or Valentino de Apreis (died 1539) was a Roman Catholic prelate who served as Bishop of Lettere-Gragnano (1517–1539).

Biography
On 23 March 1517, Valentino d'Apreja was appointed during the papacy of Pope Leo X as Bishop of Lettere-Gragnano.
He served as Bishop of Lettere-Gragnano until his death in 1539.

References

External links and additional sources
 (for Chronology of Bishops) 
 (for Chronology of Bishops)  

16th-century Italian Roman Catholic bishops
Bishops appointed by Pope Leo X
1539 deaths